Lars-Gunnar Bertil Wigemark (born 20 March 1960) is a Swedish diplomat.

Career
He was born on March 20, 1960 in Göteborg, Sweden. He graduated from Harvard University in 1984 with an A.B. magna cum laude in Social Sciences and holds a master's degree from the Fletcher School of Law and Diplomacy in International Law and Economics.

In September 2010 the European Union High Representative Catherine Ashton appointed him as one of the first EU ambassadors as an ambassador to Pakistan. He took the post in 2011 and took it until 2015. He served from 2015 to 2019 as the EU Ambassador and Special Representative to Bosnia and Herzegovina. In 2019, he was EU Ambassador at Large for the Arctic. Since 2019, Wigemark serves as head of the EULEX Kosovo mission.

References

External links

21st-century Swedish diplomats
Living people
Ambassadors of the European Union to Bosnia and Herzegovina
Ambassadors of the European Union to Pakistan
1960 births
Harvard College alumni
The Fletcher School at Tufts University alumni
Swedish officials of the European Union
People from Gothenburg